Anahit Avanesian (born 21 March 1981) is an Armenian jurist and the current Armenian Minister of Health. Before, she has been a jurist in the Armenian Ministry of Foreign Affairs and the pharmaceutical industry.

Education 
She enrolled in the Faculty of Law of the Yerevan State University in 1997 from where she earned a M.Sc. in Civil Law in 2003. She followed up on her studies at the American University of Armenia, graduating from the Master Programme in Law. Between 2002 and 2004, she took part in Leadership Programs of the Leadership Development Center and the South Caucasus Young Women Leadership program.

Professional career 
Her professional career began in 2000 as a jurist for the Ministry of Foreign Affairs and the State Reserve Agency in the Ministry of Emergency situations. From 2005 until 2015 she was a jurist for the NGO Democracy Today. By 2014 she transferred into the pharmaceutical industry to Arpharmacia where she acted as member of the board from 2017 and 2018.

Political career 
She entered the public administration in May 2018 as a deputy Health Minister, becoming in May 2020 the First Deputy Health Minister. In January 2021, she became the successor of Health Minister Arsen Torosyan (hy) from the Civil Contract and is the only woman in the Cabinet of Prime Minister Nikol Pashynian. As Health Minister, she was a central figure responsible for dealing with affronting the COVID-19 pandemic.

Personal life 
She is married and has three children.

References 

1981 births
Living people
Armenian jurists
Yerevan State University alumni
21st-century Armenian women politicians
21st-century Armenian politicians